Glasgow South is a burgh constituency of the House of Commons of the Parliament of the United Kingdom (Westminster). It elects one Member of Parliament (MP) by the first past the post system of election.

The constituency was first used in the 2005 general election, and is the successor to Glasgow Cathcart.

Boundaries

The Glasgow City wards of Battlefield, Carmunnock, Carnwadric, Castlemilk, Cathcart, Glenwood, King's Park, Langside, Maxwell Park, Mount Florida, Newlands, and Pollokshaws.

Glasgow South is one of seven constituencies covering the Glasgow City council area. All are entirely within the council area.

Prior to the 2005 general election, the city area was covered by ten constituencies, of which two straddled boundaries with other council areas. The area of the South constituency was covered by the Glasgow Cathcart constituency and parts of the Glasgow Govan, Glasgow Rutherglen and Glasgow Pollok constituencies.

Scottish Parliament constituencies retain the names and boundaries of the older Westminster constituencies.

Constituency profile 
While this constituency includes some of Glasgow's few Conservative-voting areas such as Pollokshields and Newlands, other areas such as Langside and Shawlands are SNP, with Labour in second place and the Conservatives far behind. While deprived housing estates typify parts of this constituency, there are still many more affluent residential areas. There is a large Asian community and Scotland's second-largest Jewish community is based around Pollokshields (the largest being in the neighbouring East Renfrewshire constituency). Around one-third of the residents in this constituency are Roman Catholics.

Members of Parliament

Election results

Elections in the 2010s

Elections in the 2000s

See also 
 Politics of Glasgow

References

♯ This reference gives all recent Glasgow City Westminster election results. You select the year and then the constituency to view the result.

Westminster Parliamentary constituencies in Scotland
Constituencies of the Parliament of the United Kingdom established in 2005
Politics of Glasgow
Pollokshields
Pollokshaws